The feminine given name Inga is a variant of the German and Scandinavian name Inge. It derives from the Germanic deity Ing. Notable people with the name include:

 Inga of Varteig (c. 1185 – 1234), mistress of King Haakon III of Norway and the mother of King Haakon IV
 Inga Abel (1946–2000), German actress
 Inga Åberg (1773–1837), Swedish actress and singer
 Inga Abitova (born 1982) Russian long-distance runner
 Inga Afonina (born 1969), Russian diver
 Inga Alsiņa (born 1979), Latvian actress
 Inga Arshakyan (born 1982), Armenian singer
 Inga Artamonova (1936–1966), Russian speed skater
 Inga Arvad (1913–1973), Danish journalist
 Inga Balstad (born 1952), Norwegian politician
 Inga Beale (born 1963), English businesswoman
 Inga Borg (1925–2017), Swedish artist and children's book author
 Inga Bostad (born 1963), Norwegian philosopher, writer and educator
 Inga Cadranel (born 1978), Canadian actress
 Inga Clendinnen (1934–2016), Australian author, historian and anthropologist
 Inga-Stina Ewbank (1932-2004), Swedish-born academic and educator 
 Inga-Britt Fredholm (1934–2016) Swedish secretary, archivist and author
 Inga Humpe (born 1956), German singer
 Inga Janulevičiūtė (born 1985), Lithuanian figure skater
 Inga Juuso (1945 – 2014), Sami singer and actress
 Inga Kennedy (born 1962), Scottish nurse and senior Royal Navy officer
 Inga Rhonda King (born 1960), Saint Vincent and the Grenadines accountant, teacher and publisher 
 Inga Landgré (born 1927), Swedish actress
 Inga Lindström (Christiane Sadlo; born 1954), German screenwriter and journalist
 Inga Lísa Middleton (born 1964), Icelandic photographer
 Inga Marchand (born 1978), American rapper known by her stage name Foxy Brown
 Inga Moore (born 1945), Anglo-Australian author and illustrator
 Inga Muscio (born 1966), American feminist author
 Inga Nielsen (1946–2008) Danish soprano
 Inga Rumpf, vocalist of German band Frumpy
 Inga Salurand (born 1983), Estonian actress
 Inga Sempé (born 1968), French designer
 Inga-Lill Sjöblom (born 1959), Swedish politician
 Inga Swenson (born 1932), American actress
 Inga Tidblad (1901–1975), Swedish actress
 Inga Thompson (born 1964), American Olympic cyclist

See also
 Inga (disambiguation)
 Ingvar (name)

References 

Danish feminine given names
Estonian feminine given names
German feminine given names
Latvian feminine given names
Lithuanian feminine given names
Norwegian feminine given names
Swedish feminine given names
Scandinavian feminine given names